Hildur Vala Einarsdóttir (born 6 February 1982) is a singer who rose to popularity after winning Idol Stjörnuleit 2, the Icelandic version of Pop Idol. She was born in Reykjavík.

Idol Stjörnuleit performances
Semi Finals: Immortality by Céline Dion & The Bee Gees
Top 10: Dark End Of The Street by Andrew Strong
Top 9: I Love The Nightlife by Alicia Bridges
Top 8: Á Nýjum Stað by Sálin hans Jóns míns
Top 7: Er Hann Birtist by Hljómar
Top 6: Everything I Do (I Do It For You) by Bryan Adams
Top 5: It's Only A Paper Moon by Bobby Darin
Top 4: You've Got A Friend by Carole King
Top 4: I Wish by Stevie Wonder
Top 3: Careless Whisper by George Michael
Top 3: Heart Of Glass by Blondie
Grand Final: Líf
Grand Final: Án Þín by Trúbrot
Grand Final: The Boy Who Giggled So Sweet by Emiliana Torrini

Discography
Albums
 Hildur Vala (2005)
 Lalala (2006)
 Geimvísindi (2018)

Singles
 Líf
 The Boy Who Giggled So Sweet
 Gleðileg Jól (2005)

Compilations
 Svona Er Sumarið 2005 (Singing Songbird)
 Pottþétt 38 (Singing Í Fylgsnum Hjartans)
 Óskalögin 9 (Singing Lif)
 Uppáhalds Ljóðin Okkar (Singing Krókódíllinn Grætur)

References

External links
Hildur Vala official site

1982 births
Living people
Hildur Vala Einarsdottir
Hildur Vala Einarsdottir
Hildur Vala Einarsdottir
Idols (TV series) winners
Hildur Vala Einarsdottir
21st-century Icelandic women singers